The Westerheversand Lighthouse is located in Westerhever, Schleswig-Holstein, Germany. Considered to be one of the best-known lighthouses in northern Germany, it was built in 1908. The lighthouse is often used for weddings, and one of the two keeper's cottages has been adapted for use by the local registrar.

The tower has been open to visitors since 2001.

See also 

 List of lighthouses in Germany

References

External links 

 

Lighthouses in Schleswig-Holstein